"The Cowherd and the Weaver Girl" are characters found in Chinese mythology and are characters appearing eponymously in a romantic Chinese folk tale. The story tells of the romance between Zhinü (the weaver girl, symbolizing the star Vega) and Niulang (the cowherd, symbolizing the star Altair). Despite their love for each other, their romance was forbidden, and thus they were banished to opposite sides of the heavenly river (symbolizing the Milky Way). Once a year, on the seventh day of the seventh lunar month, a flock of magpies would form a bridge to reunite the lovers for a single day. Though there are many variations of the story, the earliest-known reference to this famous myth dates back to a poem from the Classic of Poetry from over 2600 years ago.

"The Cowherd and the Weaver Girl" originated from people’s worship of natural celestial phenomena, and later developed into the Qiqiao or Qixi Festival since the Han Dynasty. It has also been celebrated as the Tanabata festival in Japan and the Chilseok festival in Korea. In ancient times, women would make wishes to the stars of Vega and Altair in the sky during the festival, hoping to have a wise mind, dexterous hand (in embroidery and other household tasks), and a good marriage.

The story was selected as one of China's Four Great Folktales by the "Folklore Movement" in the 1920s—the others being the Legend of the White Snake, Lady Meng Jiang, and Liang Shanbo and Zhu Yingtai—but Idema (2012) also notes that this term neglects the variations and therefore diversity of the tales, as only a single version was taken as the true version.

The story of The Cowherd and the Weaver Girl and its two main characters are popular in various parts of Asia and elsewhere, with different places adopting different variations. Some historical and cross cultural similarities to other stories have also been observed. The story is referenced in various literary and popular culture sources.

Literature
The tale has been alluded to in many literary works. One of the most famous was the poem by Qin Guan(秦观) (1049–1100) during the Song dynasty:

Du Fu(杜甫) (712–770) of the Tang dynasty wrote a poem about the heavenly river:

Influence and variations
The story is popular in other parts of Asia, with variations in different locations. In Southeast Asia, the story has been conflated into a Jataka tale detailing the story of Manohara, the youngest of seven daughters of the Kinnara King who lives on Mount Kailash and falls in love with Prince Sudhana.

In Korea, the story focuses on Jicknyeo, a weaver girl who falls in love with Gyeonwoo, a herder. In Japan, the story revolves around the romance between the deities, Orihime and Hikoboshi. In Vietnam, the story is known as Ngưu Lang Chức Nữ and revolves around the story of Chức Nữ, the weaver, and Ngưu Lang, the herder of buffalos. The Vietnamese version is also titled The Weaver Fairy and the Buffalo Boy.

Chinese folklorist and scholar  classified the versions of the Cowherd and the Weaver Girl under the Aarne–Thompson–Uther Index ATU 400, "The Quest for the Lost Wife". The tale also holds similarities with widespread tales of the swan maiden (bird maiden or bird princess). There are also distinct similarities to the Mesopotamian tale of Dumuzid and Inanna.

Cultural references

 Reference to the story was made by Carl Sagan in his book Contact. 
 The story, as well as the puppetry shown, was told by Meiying to Dre Parker during the Qi Xi Festival in the film  The Karate Kid.
 The tale and the Tanabata festival are also the basis of the Sailor Moon side story entitled Chibiusa's Picture Diary-Beware the Tanabata!, where both Vega and Altair make an appearance. 
 The post-hardcore band La Dispute named and partially based their first album, Somewhere at the Bottom of the River Between Vega and Altair, after the tale. 
 The JRPG Bravely Second: End Layer also uses the names Vega and Altair for a pair of story-important characters who shared a love interest in each other years before the game's story began, Deneb being their common friend. 
 The K-pop girl group Red Velvet's song "One of These Nights" from their 2016 EP The Velvet also references the legend of the two lovers. 
 J-pop band Supercell also references the story on its song "Kimi no Shiranai Monogatari". 
 The novel Bridge of Birds by Barry Hughart is centered around the tale, but incorporates many more Chinese folk stories while retelling the tale.
 K-pop girl group Dreamcatcher's song "July 7th" from their EP Alone in the City, is based on this tale.
 The South Korean television series Vincenzo features a reference to the legend of the lovers, in which Vincenzo mixes up the names from the Korean tale.
 In The Big Bang Theory, S07E19 "The Indecision Amalgamation", Raj references the story to Penny as a romantic folk tale. 
The K-pop boy group Treasure's song "B.L.T", the b-side track from their second single album The First Step: Chapter Two is also based on this story.
The J-rock group Alice Nine's song "Heisei Jyuushichinen Shichigatsu Nanoka" from their 2005 EP "Alice in Wonderland" is based on this story.

Similar to the Chang'e space program being named after the Chinese goddess of the moon, the Queqiao relay satellite of Chang'e 4 is named after the "bridge of magpies" from the Chinese tale of the cowherd and weaver girl. The Chang'e 4 landing site is known as Statio Tianhe, which refers to the heavenly river in the tale. The nearby far-side lunar craters Zhinyu and Hegu are named after Chinese constellations associated with the weaver girl and the cowherd.

In Japan, the Engineering Test Satellite VII mission was an automated rendezvous and docking test of two satellites nicknamed "Orihime" and "Hikoboshi."

Gallery

See also

 Qixi Festival
Tanabata Festival
Chilseok Festival

References

Further reading

 Yu, Eric Kwan-wai. “Of Marriage, Labor and the Small Peasant Family: A Morphological and Feminist Study of the Cowherd and Weaving Maid Folktales.” Comparative Literature and Culture 3 (1998): 11-51.

External links

 

Buddhist folklore
Chinese folklore
Love stories
Fictional duos
ATU 400-459
Swan maidens